The Newport Apartments on Seventh Street in Devils Lake, North Dakota were built in 1929.  They were designed in Bungalow/Craftsman style by Devils Lake architect John Marshall.  They were listed on the National Register of Historic Places in 1988.

It "represents the only known private commission by Devils Lake local architect, John Marshall, and is an excellent representative
of the style."

References

Residential buildings on the National Register of Historic Places in North Dakota
Residential buildings completed in 1929
American Craftsman architecture in North Dakota
Bungalow architecture in North Dakota
National Register of Historic Places in Ramsey County, North Dakota
1929 establishments in North Dakota